Gideon White (March 1753 – September 30, 1833) was an American military officer who served as a captain in the Duke of Cumberland's Regiment and then became a merchant, judge and political figure in Nova Scotia. He represented Barrington Township in the Nova Scotia House of Assembly from 1790 to 1793.

Early life 
He was born in Plymouth, Massachusetts, the son of Captain Gideon White and Joanna Howland, both descendants of the Pilgrims.

Career 
White was in Nova Scotia in 1776. In September that same year, he was captured by an American privateer and taken back to Massachusetts where he was placed under house arrest. White went to Liverpool, Nova Scotia in the winter of the following year. After trading in the Caribbean, he established himself as a merchant in Charleston, South Carolina. In 1782, he went to New York City and served as a captain in the Duke of Cumberland's Regiment. White settled at Shelburne, Nova Scotia with other members of that retired regiment in 1784, retiring on half pay from his military service.

He served as a justice of the peace for Halifax County and then Shelburne County, also serving as custos rotulorum, major in the militia, customs collector, justice in the Inferior Court of Common Pleas and as commissioner of bridges and roads.

He was elected to the assembly in a by-election held after Joseph Aplin left the province in 1789, taking his seat March 1, 1790.

Personal life 
In 1787, he married Deborah Whitworth. White died in Shelburne, Nova Scotia at the age of 80. He was a cousin of Edward Winslow.

See also 
Nova Scotia in the American Revolution

References

External links 
 

1753 births
1833 deaths
Nova Scotia pre-Confederation MLAs
Colony of Nova Scotia judges
People from Plymouth, Massachusetts